Parliamentary elections were held in the Kingdom of Croatia-Slavonia on 3, 4 and 5 May 1906. 45,381 people were entitled to vote in the elections. The People's Party won 37 seats, the Croat-Serb Coalition 32 seats, and Starčević's Party of Rights (led by Josip Frank) won 19. On 30 April Nikola Tomašić, leader of the People's Party, renounced his candidature and left politics for a short time.

Results

References

Elections in Croatia
Croatia
1906 in Croatia
Elections in Austria-Hungary
May 1906 events
Kingdom of Croatia-Slavonia
Election and referendum articles with incomplete results